Global Fighting Championship was a Dubai-based kickboxing and mixed martial arts (MMA) promotion. Fighters from around world on the roster included Badr Hari, Peter Aerts, Gökhan Saki and Zabit Samedov. It was considered as the biggest kickboxing and MMA promotion in Middle East.

Overview 
Each event had a 4 Man Tournament in the heavy weight division with a winning amount of AED 1 Million. Along with the 4 Man Tournament, 7 superfights were conducted with kickboxers and MMA fighters from around the world. A total of 8 fight series had to be conducted, with each winner progressing towards the grand prix of $1 Million. The first series, took place at Dubai World Trade Centre on 29 May 2014 and featured Peter Aerts, Badr Hari and Stefan Leko.

GFC Series 
GFC Fight Series 1  took place on 29 May 2014 at Dubai World Trade Centre, with Dutch Moroccan Badr Hari  emerging as winner of the AED 1 Million defeating Australian  Peter Graham in the final and advancing to the GFC Grand Prix. Michael Buffer was the presenter with Mike Markham taking over as Ring announcer and Michael Schiavello as the Commentator.

GFC Fight Series 2  took place on 16 October 2014 at Dubai Duty Free Tennis Stadium, with Moroccan Ismael Lazar  emerging as winner of the AED 1 Million defeating Senegal's  Sem Tevette by TKO in Round 2 in the final and advancing to the GFC Grand Prix. Mike Markham was the  Ring announcer along with Steve Patrick Moore. Moroccan Badr Hari was supposed to fight French Patrice Quarteron in the Exhibition Superfight, but the fight fell through. Patrice Quarteron was eventually replaced with Lithuanian Arnold Oborotov. Melvin Manhoef was replaced with Sem Tevette days before the fight due to an injury. He still came to support his replacement who lost the finals to Ismael Lazzar.

GFC Fight Series 3  took place on 17 April 2015 at Dubai Duty Free Tennis Stadium once again. The fight card included Zabit Samedov, Danyo Ilunga and Ismael Lazaar. Gökhan Saki made an appearance in the main event against Sebastian Ciobanu.

Controversy 
Badr Hari vs Patrice Quarteron was the much-awaited fight among fans for GFC Fighter Series 2. Due to Quarteron's unsportsmanlike conduct, he was axed from the fight. Hari went on to say "About Patrice... he has been saying a lot about me. I don't care, I have been through those kind of clowns many times so he's nothing special,". Quarteron had made quite a hype about the fight across all social media platforms bashing Hari with memes. He was eventually replaced with Arnold Oborotov who lost to Badr Hari by KO in round 1.

References

 
 
Sports organizations established in 2012 
Mixed martial arts organizations
Kickboxing organizations
Companies based in Dubai